Nikolaos Skoufas is a municipality in the regional unit of Arta, Greece, named after Nikolaos Skoufas, a leader of the Greek independence movement. The seat of the municipality is in Peta. The municipality has an area of 231.842 km2.

Municipality
The present municipality Nikolaos Skoufas was formed at the 2011 local government reform by the merger of the following 4 former municipalities, that became municipal units:
Arachthos
Kommeno
Kompoti
Peta

References

Populated places in Arta (regional unit)
Municipalities of Epirus (region)